The flag of Greenland was designed by Greenland native Thue Christiansen. It features two equal horizontal bands of white (top) and red (bottom) with a counter-changed red-and-white disk slightly to the hoist side of centre. The entire flag measures 18 by 12 parts; each stripe measures 6 parts; the disk is 8 parts in diameter, horizontally offset by 7 parts from the hoist to the centre of the circle, and vertically centered.

The term  (meaning "the red") is also used for both the Greenlandic flag and the flag of Denmark. The flag of Greenland is the only national flag of a Nordic country or territory without a Nordic cross.

History 
Greenland first entertained the idea of a flag of its own in 1973 when five Greenlanders proposed a green, white and blue flag. The following year, a newspaper solicited eleven design proposals (all but one of which was a Nordic cross) and polled the people to determine the most popular. The flag of Denmark was preferred to the others. Little came of this effort.

In 1978, Denmark granted home rule to Greenland, making it an equal member of the Danish Realm. The home rule government held an official call for flag proposals, receiving 555 (of which 293 were submitted by Greenlanders).

The deciding committee came to no consensus, so more proposals were solicited. Finally, the present red-and-white design by Thue Christiansen narrowly won over a green-and-white Nordic cross by a vote of fourteen to eleven. Christiansen's red-and-white flag was officially adopted on 21 June 1985.

To honour the tenth anniversary of the flag, the Greenland Post Office issued commemorative postage stamps and a leaflet by the flag's creator. He described the white stripe as representing the glaciers and ice cap, which cover more than 80% of the island; the red stripe, the ocean; the red semicircle, the sun, with its bottom part sunk in the ocean; and the white semicircle, the icebergs and pack ice. The design is also reminiscent of the setting Sun half-submerged below the horizon and reflected on the sea. In 1985, it was reported that Greenland's flag had exactly the same motif as the flag of the Danish rowing club HEI Rosport, which was founded before Greenland's flag was chosen. It is not clear whether this is a case of plagiarism or just a coincidence, but the rowing club gave Greenland permission to use their flag.

The colours of the flag are the same as those of the flag of Denmark, symbolizing Greenland's place in the Danish realm.

Other proposals

See also

Flag of Denmark
Flag of the Faroe Islands
List of flags of Denmark
Raven banner

References

External links

 FOTW: Greenland - History of the flag
 Other flag proposals for a Nordic cross design
 http://www.flagscorner.com/greenland-flag/ 

Greenland
National symbols of Greenland
Greenland
Greenland
Greenland
Greenland
Greenland
1989 establishments in Greenland
Greenland